Franz Kafka's It's a Wonderful Life is a 1993 British short comedy film written and directed  by Peter Capaldi. It stars Richard E. Grant as Franz Kafka and co-stars Ken Stott. The title refers to the name of the writer Franz Kafka and the 1946 film It's a Wonderful Life, directed by Frank Capra, and the plot takes the concept of the two to absurd depths.

The film features a rendition of "Ah! Sweet Mystery of Life" from the 1910 operetta Naughty Marietta.

In 1994, the short won the BAFTA Award for Best Short Film. The following year it won the Academy Award for Best Live Action Short Film, tying with Trevor.

Synopsis
The great writer Franz Kafka is about to write his famous 1915 work, The Metamorphosis, but inspiration is lacking, and he suffers continual interruptions.

Cast
 Richard E. Grant – Franz Kafka
 Crispin Letts – Gregor Samsa
 Ken Stott – Woland the Knifeman
 Elaine Collins – Miss Cicely
 Phyllis Logan – Frau Bunofsky
 Julie Cox – Party Girl
 Jessie Doyle – Party Girl
 Samantha Howarth – Party Girl
 Justine Luxton – Party Girl
 Laura Reiss – Party Girl
 Thea Tait – Party Girl
 Lucy Woodhouse – Party Girl

Accolades

References

External links

 
 Full record for Franz Kafka's It's a Wonderful Life at the National Library of Scotland

1993 films
1993 comedy films
Live Action Short Film Academy Award winners
English-language Scottish films
Works about Franz Kafka
Cultural depictions of Franz Kafka
Films directed by Peter Capaldi
Scottish films
BBC Scotland television shows
1993 short films
British comedy short films
1990s English-language films